The National Stadium of Thailand is a sports complex located in Pathum Wan District, Bangkok. Founded in 1937 with the construction of Supachalasai Stadium, its main venue, the complex has since expanded and now consists of multiple stadia and sporting facilities.

History

The stadium construction started in 1937 in the original area of Thai Windsor Palace that demolished in 1935. The Department of Physical Education entered into a 29-year lease agreement with Chulalongkorn University. First use of the stadium happened when King Ananda Mahidol presided over in the opening ceremony of 1938 men's athletics competition, which changed the venue from Sanam Luang.

It is used mostly for football matches. It served as the main stadium for the 1966, 1970, and 1978 Asian Games. It was also used for the 2007 AFC Asian Cup, but only for one game (Oman v Iraq in Group A). The stadium is easy for spectators to get to as it is served by the BTS Skytrain which stops at the 'National Stadium BTS station' right next to the stadium.

The stadium is a single tier construction which is uncovered on three sides. A plain but effective roof covers the main-stand side. Although there is a running track, the tribunes are immediately adjacent to it so spectators are not as far from the action as they are at the newer Rajamangala Stadium. Spectator comfort was increased in 2007 with the addition of red bench seats to the previously bare concrete steps on the three open sides.

Thai league clubs often play at the Suphachalasai in Asian competitions as their own stadiums do not meet Asian Football Confederation criteria. However, it is now rarely used by the national team who usually play at the Rajamangala National Stadium. Other stadiums in Bangkok include the Thai Army Sports Stadium, the Thai-Japanese Stadium and Chulalongkorn University Stadium.

On 24 and 27 August 1993, Entertainer Michael Jackson performed 2 concerts there during his Dangerous World Tour in front of 140,000 in attendance.

Stadium Facility

Suphachalasai Stadium

Suphachalasai Stadium is the majority part of the National Stadium. It is the multi-purpose stadium with track and field for athletic purposes, as well as a partial roof on one of its side. With its capacity of 19,793, the stadium is being used to hold important matches such as the Thai FA Cup and Thai League Cup. The stadium named after Luang Supachalasai (Bung Supachalasai), considered the Father of Thai Sport and the first Director-General of Thai Department of Physical Education.

Thephasadin Stadium

Thephasadin Stadium was constructed in 1965 for the use in 1966 Asian Games as the Hockey venue, hence its original name, Hockey Field. It was renamed in 1983 in memorial of Sanan Thephasadin na Ayutthaya, considered the Father of Thai Football. With its capacity of 6,378 seats, it was retired from being the hockey stadium.

Jindarat Stadium
Jindarat Stadium, constructed after the Pacific War, was formerly used as the outdoor stadium for medium-level sporting events and practicing purposes. It was originally named Ton Pho Stadium, but was renamed in 1983 in memorial of Jindarat (Jamlong Sawat-chuto), former director of the Office of Sports and Recreation Development.

Wisutamol Pool
Wisutamol Pool was constructed in 1961 under the term of director Kong Wisutamol. It was the Olympic-size swimming pool with two sides of stands, used for the competition and general practices. Originally named the Olympic Pool, it was renamed in memorial of the director Wisutamol who organized the construction.

Nimibutr Stadium

Nimibutr Stadium, opened in 1963 is an indoor stadium used for sports including boxing, badminton, gymnastics, futsal, basketball and handball.

Jhanthana-Yingyong Gymnasium
Jhanthana-Yingyong Gymnasium was built in 1965.

Notes and references

See also 
 Rajamangala National Stadium

External links

Thailand
Football venues in Thailand
Athletics (track and field) venues in Thailand
Rugby union stadiums in Asia
AFC Asian Cup stadiums
Sports venues in Bangkok
Stadiums of the Asian Games
Venues of the 1966 Asian Games
Venues of the 1970 Asian Games
Venues of the 1978 Asian Games
Venues of the 1998 Asian Games
Asian Games athletics venues
Asian Games football venues
Southeast Asian Games stadiums
Southeast Asian Games athletics venues
Southeast Asian Games football venues
Multi-purpose stadiums in Thailand
Sports venues completed in 1935
Pathum Wan district
1935 establishments in Siam
Property Management of Chulalongkorn University
Asian Games water polo venues